Minnesota is currently divided into eight congressional districts, each represented by a member of the United States House of Representatives. After the 2020 census, the number of Minnesota's seats remained unchanged.

Minnesota statutes do not require candidates for the United States House of Representatives to reside in the district in which they run for office, but candidates must be inhabitants of the state at the time of the election.

Current districts and representatives
List of members of the United States House delegation from Minnesota, their terms, their district boundaries, and the district political ratings according to the CPVI. The delegation has a total of eight members, consisting of four Democrats and four Republicans.

Historical and present district boundaries
Table of United States congressional district boundary maps in the State of Minnesota, presented chronologically. All redistricting events that took place in Minnesota between 1973 and 2013 are shown.

Obsolete districts

Districts

Congressional districts are also used to ensure regional representation on other government bodies within the state. The following entities are required by state statute to have at least one member from each congressional district:

 The Minnesota Court of Appeals (based on a judge's place of residence for a minimum of one year upon initial appointment or election).
 The Board of Regents of the University of Minnesota.
 The Minnesota State Colleges and Universities System Board of Trustees.
 The state Board of Invention.

Minnesota currently has eight congressional districts. There were 9th and 10th districts but they were eliminated in 1963 and 1933 respectively. Redistricting is done every 10 years to reflect population shifts within the United States.

 : 1903–1933, 1935–1963 (obsolete since the 1960 census)
 : 1915–1933 (obsolete since the 1930 census)

See also

List of United States congressional districts

References

External links
Minnesota congressional districts map, 2013–present Minnesota Legislative Coordinating Commission